Kuokka is a Finnish surname. Notable people with the surname include:

Ilmari Kuokka (1901–1981), Finnish long-distance runner
Mauri Kuokka, Finnish sports shooter

Finnish-language surnames